Essington is a 1974 TV film about a convict named Squires who arrives with a detachment of Royal Marines at Port Essington.

According to the Canberra Times "it is both an historical narrative and an allegorical treatment of Australian history."

Plot
In the 1840s, the settlement of Port Essington is run by Governor Macarthur. The inhabitants include Macarthur's wife, Private Evans, and a convict, Bob Squires, who has good relations with the local aboriginal population.

Private Evans falls for an aboriginal woman and goes missing from the settlement.

Cast
Chris Haywood as Bob Squires
Jacqueline Kott
Sandra McGregor
Wyn Roberts
Michael Craig
Cornelia Frances
Melissa Jaffer
John Hargreaves
Ralph Cotterill
Hugh Keays-Byrne	
Justine Saunders

Reception
Thomas Keneally won Best Script at the 1976 Logie Awards. Chis Haywood won Best Performance by an Individual Actor.

Michael Craig called it "a wonderful script; macabre, funny, tragic and optimistic, and extremely well directed by Julian Pringle."

Music
The music score was written by Peter Sculthorpe with Michael Hannan and David Matthews. It was adapted from an Aboriginal melody "Djilile" (whistling-duck on a billabong) from a recording collected in northern Australia in the late 1950s. Sculthorpe further developed the music as a 15-minute, six-part piece titled "Port Essington" which was commissioned by Musica Viva Australia for the Australian Chamber Orchestra and first performed at the University of Queensland in August 1977.

References

External links

Essington at Screen Australia
Digitised copy of complete script by Thomas Keneally at National Archives of Australia

Australian television films
Television shows set in colonial Australia
Television shows set in the Northern Territory
1974 television films
1974 films
Films directed by Julian Pringle